Rainbow, Virginia is an unincorporated community near Clifton, Virginia.

Roads
Beachplum Drive
Silverleaf Drive
Hollygrape Lane
Goldflower Drive

References
Google Maps of Rainbow

Unincorporated communities in Fairfax County, Virginia
Washington metropolitan area
Unincorporated communities in Virginia
Clifton, Virginia